Chen Chi-ting (born 1 September 1999) is a Taiwanese badminton player. Chen who educated in Kaohsiung middle school, was the winner of Asian Junior U–17 Championships in 2015, and later won the bronze medal in the U–19 Championships in 2017. He captured the boys' singles title at the 2017 Dutch Junior Grand Prix tournament.

Achievements

Asian Junior Championships 
Boys' singles

BWF International Challenge/Series (1 runner-up) 
Men's singles

  BWF International Challenge tournament
  BWF International Series tournament
  BWF Future Series tournament

BWF Junior International (1 title, 2 runners-up) 
Boys' singles

Mixed doubles

  BWF Junior International Grand Prix tournament
  BWF Junior International Challenge tournament
  BWF Junior International Series tournament
  BWF Junior Future Series tournament

References

External links 

Living people
1999 births
Taiwanese male badminton players